Vegard Østraat Erlien (born 26 June 1998) is a Norwegian footballer who plays as a midfielder for Ranheim.

He signed a contract with Ranheim in 2019. He previously played for Sandnes Ulf.

Career statistics

Club

References

1998 births
Living people
Footballers from Trondheim
Norwegian footballers
Norway youth international footballers
Sandnes Ulf players
Ranheim Fotball players
Eliteserien players
Norwegian First Division players
Association football midfielders